The mangonel, also called the traction trebuchet, was a type of trebuchet used in Ancient China starting from the Warring States period, and later across Eurasia by the 6th century AD. Unlike the later counterweight trebuchet, the mangonel operated on manpower pulling cords attached to a lever and sling to launch projectiles.

Although the mangonel required more men to function, it was also less complex and faster to reload than the torsion-powered onager which it replaced in early Medieval Europe. It was replaced as the primary siege weapon in the 12th and 13th centuries by the counterweight trebuchet. A common misconception about the mangonel is that it was a torsion siege engine.

Etymology
Mangonel is probably derived from the Greek mangana, "a generic term for construction machinery." It could also be derived from mangon, a French hard stone found in the south of France. In Latin it is called a manganum, in French a manganeau, and in English a mangonel. Mangonel was a general term  for medieval stone-throwing artillery and used more specifically to refer to manually (traction-) powered weapons. It is sometimes wrongly used to refer to the onager. Modern military historians came up with the term "traction trebuchet" to distinguish it from previous torsion machines such as the onager.

The mangonel was called al-manjanīq, arrada, shaytani, or sultani in Arabic. In China the mangonel was called the pào (砲).

History

China

The mangonel is thought to have originated in ancient China. Torsion-based siege weapons such as the ballista and onager are not known to have been used in China. 

The first recorded use of mangonels was in ancient China. They were probably used by the Mohists as early as 4th century BC, descriptions of which can be found in the Mojing (compiled in the 4th century BC). They were used as defensive weapons stationed on walls and sometimes hurled hollowed out logs filled with burning charcoal to destroy enemy siege works. By the 1st century AD, commentators were interpreting other passages in texts such as the Zuo zhuan and Classic of Poetry as references to the mangonel: "the guai is 'a great arm of wood on which a stone is laid, and this by means of a device [ji] is shot off and so strikes down the enemy.'" The Records of the Grand Historian say that "The flying stones weigh 12 catties and by devices [ji] are shot off 300 paces." Mangonels went into decline during the Han dynasty due to long periods of peace but became a common siege weapon again during the Three Kingdoms period. They were commonly called stone-throwing machines, thunder carriages, and stone carriages in the following centuries. They were used as ship mounted weapons by 573 for attacking enemy fortifications. It seems that during the early 7th century, improvements were made on mangonels, although it is not explicitly stated what. According to a stele in Barkul celebrating Tang Taizong's conquest of what is now Ejin Banner, the engineer Jiang Xingben made great advancements on mangonels that were unknown in ancient times. Jiang Xingben participated in the construction of siege engines for Taizong's campaigns against the Western Regions. 

In 617 Li Mi (Sui dynasty) constructed 300 mangonels for his assault on Luoyang, in 621 Li Shimin did the same at Luoyang, and onward into the Song dynasty when in 1161, mangonels operated by Song dynasty soldiers fired bombs of lime and sulphur against the ships of the Jin dynasty navy during the Battle of Caishi. During the Jingde period (1004-1007), many young men rose in office due to their military accomplishments, and one such man, Zhang Cun, was said to have possessed no knowledge except how to operate a Whirlwind mangonel. When the Jurchen Jin dynasty (1115–1234) laid siege to Kaifeng in 1126, they attacked with 5,000 mangonels.

Chinese mangonels
The Wujing Zongyao lists various types of the mangonel:

 Whirlwind - a swivel mangonel for shooting small missiles that could be turned to face any direction
 Whirlwind battery - five whirlwind mangonels combined on a single turntable
 Pao che (catapult cart) - a whirlwind mangonel on wheels
 Crouching tiger - medium sized mangonel considered stronger than the whirlwind type but weaker than the four-footed
 Four-footed - a trestle-frame mangonel for shooting heavier projectiles
 Two-seven component - different weight classes for the four-footed type indicated by the number of poles bound together to create the swinging arm

Spread

The mangonel was carried westward by the Avars and appeared next in the eastern Mediterranean by the late 6th century AD, where it replaced torsion powered siege engines such as the ballista and onager. The rapid displacement of torsion siege engines was probably due to a combination of reasons. The mangonel is simpler in design, has a faster rate of fire, increased accuracy, and comparable range and power. It was probably also safer than the twisted cords of torsion weapons, "whose bundles of taut sinews stored up huge amounts of energy even in resting state and were prone to catastrophic failure when in use." At the same time, the late Roman Empire seems to have fielded "considerably less artillery than its forebears, organised now in separate units, so the weaponry that came into the hands of successor states might have been limited in quantity." Evidence from Gaul and Germania suggests there was substantial loss of skills and techniques in artillery further west.

According to the Miracles of Saint Demetrius, probably written around 620 by John, Archbishop of Thessaloniki, the Avaro-Slavs attacked Thessaloniki in 586 with mangonel. The bombardment lasted for hours, but the operators were inaccurate and most of the shots missed their target. When one stone did reach their target, it "demolished the top of the rampart down to the walkway." The Byzantines adopted the mangonel possibly as early as 587, the Persians in the early 7th century, and the Arabs in the second half of the 7th century. Like the Chinese, by 653, the Arabs also had ship mounted mangonel. The Franks and Saxons adopted the weapon in the 8th century. The Life of Louis the Pious contains the earliest western European reference to mangonels in its account of the siege of Tortosa (808–809). In the 890s, Abbo Cernuus described mango or manganaa used at the Siege of Paris (885–886) which had high posts, presumably meaning they used trebuchet-type throwing arms. In 1173, the Republic of Pisa tried to capture an island castle with mangonels on galleys. Mangonels were also used in India.

According to Leife Inge Ree Peterson, a mangonel could have been used at Theodosiopolis in 421 but was "likely an onager". He also claims that mangonels were independently invented or at least known in the Eastern Mediterranean by 500 AD based on records of different and better artillery weapons, however there is no explicit description of a mangonel. Furthermore mangonels were used in Spain and Italy by the mid 6th century and in Africa by the 7th century. The Franks adopted the weapon in the 8th century. Another theory points to the independent invention of the mangonel through an evolution of the Byzantine staff-sling, although this has received little support.

Function
The mangonel was most efficient as an anti-personnel weapon, used in a supportive position alongside archers and slingers. Most accounts of mangonels describe them as light artillery weapons while actual penetration of defenses was the result of mining or siege towers. At the Siege of Kamacha in 766, Byzantine defenders used wooden cover to protect themselves from the enemy artillery while inflicting casualties with their own stone throwers. Michael the Syrian noted that at the siege of Balis in 823 it was the defenders that suffered from bombardment rather than the fortifications. At the siege of Kaysum, Abdallah ibn Tahir al-Khurasani used artillery to damage houses in the town. The Sack of Amorium in 838 saw the use of mangonels to drive away defenders and destroy wooden defenses. At the siege of Marand in 848, mangonels were used, "reportedly killing 100 and wounding 400 on each side during the eight-month siege." During the siege of Baghdad in 865, defensive artillery were responsible for repelling an attack on the city gate while mangonels on boats claimed a hundred of the defenders' lives.

Some exceptionally large and powerful mangonels have been described during the 11th century or later. At the Siege of Manzikert (1054), the Seljuks' initial siege artillery was countered by the defenders' own, which shot stones at the besieging machine. In response, the Seljuks constructed another one requiring 400 men to pull and threw stones weighing 20 kg. A breach was created on the first shot but the machine was burnt down by the defenders. According to Matthew of Edessa, this machine weighed 3,400 kg and caused a number of casualties to the city's defenders. Ibn al-Adim describes a mangonel capable of throwing a man in 1089. At the siege of Haizhou in 1161, a mangonel was reported to have had a range of 200 paces (over 400 meters).

Decline
West of China, the mangonel remained the primary siege engine until the late 12th century when it was replaced by the counterweight trebuchet. In China the mangonel was the primary siege engine until the counterweight trebuchet was introduced during the Mongol conquest of the Song dynasty in the 13th century. The counterweight trebuchet did not completely replace the mangonel. Despite its greater range, counterweight trebuchets had to be constructed close to the site of the siege unlike mangonels, which were smaller, lighter, cheaper, and easier to take apart and put back together again where necessary. The superiority of the counterweight trebuchet was not clear cut. Of this, the Hongwu Emperor stated in 1388: "The old type of trebuchet was really more convenient. If you have a hundred of those machines, then when you are ready to march, each wooden pole can be carried by only four men. Then when you reach your destination, you encircle the city, set them up, and start shooting!" The mangonel continued to serve as an anti-personnel weapon. The Norwegian text of 1240, Speculum regale, explicitly states this division of functions. Mangonels were to be used for hitting people in undefended areas. As late as the Siege of Acre (1291), where the Mamluk Sultanate fielded 72 or 92 trebuchets, the majority were still mangonels while 14 or 15 were counterweight trebuchets. The counterweight trebuchets were unable to create a breach in Acre's walls and the Mamluks entered the city by sapping the northeast corner of the outer wall. The Templar of Tyre described the faster firing mangonels as more dangerous to the defenders than the counterweight trebuchets.

See also
Catapult
Couillard
Springald
List of siege engines

References

Bibliography 

 . Original version.

External links

 Res Gestae, 4th century, by Ammianus Marcellinus
 Medieval Mechanical Artillery, by the Xenophon Group
 Onager Physics. An analysis of the Onager/Mangonel

Ancient artillery
Artillery of China
Chinese inventions
Medieval siege engines
Roman siege engines